Raghunandana (c. 16th century CE) was an Indian Sanskrit scholar from the Bengal region. His writings include 28 Smriti digests on Hindu law and a commentary on Dayabhaga.

Life 

Raghunandana was born at Nabadwip, to Harihara Bhattacharya. He was a pupil of Srinatha Acharya Chudamani. His writings mention Rayamukuta (1431 CE), and are mentioned by Viramitrodaya of Mitramisra (early 17th century). Thus, it can be inferred that Raghunandana lived around 16th century CE.

The various estimates of his lifespan include:

 Rajendra Chandra Hazra: 1520-1570
 Monmohan Chakravarti: born 1490 or 1500, literary activity during 1520-1575
 Pandurang Vaman Kane: 1510-1580

Bani Chakravarti wrote a book on him, titled Samaj-samskarak Raghunandan (1964), in Bengali language.

Works

Astavimsati-tattva 

Raghunandana authored 28 Smriti digests on civil law and rituals, collectively known as Astavimsati-tattva. The English scholars compared Raghunandana's digests to the Comyns' Digest, and called him the "Comyns of India".

The titles of these digests end in the word tattva (literally "essence"). 27 of these works are mentioned at the beginning of Malamasa-tattva.

The 28 digests include:

Chandoga-vrsotsarga-tattva, Rgvrsotsarga-tattva and Yajur-vrsotsarga-tattva are collectively known as Vrsotsarga-tattva. Deva-pratishtha-tattva and Matha-pratishtha-tattva are collectively known as Pratishtha-tattva.

Commentary on Dayabhaga 

Raghunandana's Dayabhaga-tika, also known as Dayabhaga-vyakhya[na], is a commentary on Jimutavahana's Hindu law treatise Dayabhaga. During the British Raj, when Hindu law was used in the courts, the Calcutta High Court termed Raghunandana's Dayabhaga-tika as the best commentary on Dayabhaga. William Jones, a puisne judge at the Supreme Court of Judicature at Fort William, mentioned that the local Hindu scholars often referred to Jimutavahana's treatise, but it was Raghunandana's work that was "more generally approved" in Bengal.

The commentary quotes several other scholars and writings, including Medhatithi, Kulluka Bhatta, Mitakshara, Vivada-Ratnakara of Chandeshvara Thakura, Shulapani and Vivada-Chintamani of Vachaspati Mishra (often critically).

There have been some doubts about the authorship of this commentary. Both Henry Thomas Colebrooke (1810) and Julius Eggeling (1891) suspected that it was not authored by the writer of Divya-tattva (that is, Raghunandana). However, Monmohan Chakravarti (1915) and Rajendra Chandra Hazra (1950) both attribute the work to Raghunandana. Pandurang Vaman Kane also ascribes the commentary to him, but not without hesitation.

Other works 

His other works include:

 Gaya-shraddha paddhati
 Graha-yaga-tattva (or Graha-pramana-tattva)
 Tirtha-yatra-tattva (or Tirtha-tattva)
 Tripuskara-santi-tattva
 Dvadasa-yatra-tattva (or Yatra-tattva)
 Rasa-yatra tattva (or Rasa-yatra paddhati)

References 

Sanskrit scholars from Bengal
16th-century Indian writers
16th-century Hindus